James Troha is an American academic administrator, currently serving as President of Juniata College in Huntingdon, Pennsylvania. Troha took office in 2013.

Early life and education 
Troha is a native of Cleveland, Ohio. He earned a Bachelor of Arts in criminal justice and master's degree in counseling from Edinboro University of Pennsylvania. He earned a PhD in educational policy from the University of Kansas.

Career 
Prior to assuming his role as president of Juniata College, Troha worked as an administrator at Heidelberg University, first as vice president for student affairs and dean of students, vice president for institutional advancement and university relations, and interim president from 2008 to 2009. From 2009 to 2013, he served as the university's vice president for institutional advancement and university relation. In 2013, it was announced that Troha has been selected by the Juniata College Board of Trustees to serve as the institution's 12th president. He took office on June 1, 2013.

References 

People from Cleveland
Edinboro University of Pennsylvania alumni
Juniata College faculty
Heidelberg University (Ohio)
University of Kansas alumni
American academic administrators